Vietnam under Chinese rule or Bắc thuộc (北屬, lit. "belonging to the north") (111 BC-939, 1407-1427) refers to four historical periods when several portions of modern-day Northern Vietnam was under the rule of various Chinese dynasties. Bắc thuộc in Vietnamese historiography is traditionally considered to have started in 111 BC, when the Han dynasty conquered Nanyue (Vietnamese "Nam Việt") and lasted to 939 when Ngô dynasty was founded. A fourth, relatively brief, 20-year rule by the Ming dynasty during the 15th century is usually excluded by historians in their discussion of the main, almost continuous, period of Chinese rule from 111 BC to 939 AD. Vietnam asserts these periods as modern reconstructions, however, and claim they serve various nationalist and irredentist causes in China, Vietnam, and other countries. Museums in Vietnam often completely omit periods of Chinese rule, skipping over large periods of its own history.

Periods of Chinese rule
The four periods of Chinese rule in Vietnam:

Geographical extent and impact
The four periods of Chinese rule did not correspond to the modern borders of Vietnam, but were mainly limited to the area around the Red River Delta and adjacent areas. During the first three periods of Chinese rule, the pre-Sinitic indigenous culture was centered in the northern part of modern Vietnam in the alluvial deltas of the Hong, Că and Mã Rivers. Ten centuries of Chinese rule left a substantial genetic footprint, with settlement by large numbers of ethnic Han, while opening up Vietnam for trade and cultural exchange.

Elements of Chinese culture such as language, religion, art and way of life constituted an important component of traditional Vietnamese culture until modernity. This cultural affiliation to China remained true even when Vietnam was militarily defending itself against attempted invasions, such as against the Yuan dynasty. Chinese characters remained the official script of Vietnam until French colonization in the 20th century, despite the rise in vernacular chữ nôm literature in the aftermath of the expulsion of the Ming. Although 1,000 years of Chinese rule left many traces, the collective memory of the periods reinforced Vietnamese cultural and later political independence.

Population

See also
 China–Vietnam relations
 Chinese expansionism
 Sinicization
 Little China (ideology)

Notes

References

Sources

External links
 Vietnam under Chinese rule on Encyclopædia Britannica

China–Vietnam relations
Historical regions of China
History of Imperial China
History of Vietnam